The 1929 Memorial Cup final was the 11th junior ice hockey championship of the Canadian Amateur Hockey Association. The George Richardson Memorial Trophy champions Toronto Marlboros of the Ontario Hockey Association in Eastern Canada competed against the Abbott Cup champions Elmwood Millionaires of the Manitoba Junior Hockey League in Western Canada. In a best-of-three series, held at the Mutual Street Arena in Toronto, Ontario, Toronto won their 1st Memorial Cup, defeating Elmwood 2 games to none.

Scores
Game 1: Toronto 4-2 Elmwood (OT)
Game 2: Toronto 4-2 Elmwood

Winning roster
Eddie Convey, Charlie Conacher, Clarence Christie, Jim Darragh, Bob Gamble, Max Hackett, Red Horner, Busher Jackson, Alex Levinsky, Alf Moore, Laurie Moore, Harry Montgomery, Ellis Pringle.  Coach: Frank J. Selke

References

External links
 Memorial Cup
 Canadian Hockey League

Memorial Cup
Ice hockey competitions in Toronto
Memorial Cup tournaments
1920s in Toronto
1929 in Ontario